Stare Kapice  is a village in the administrative district of Gmina Tykocin, within Białystok County, Podlaskie Voivodeship, in north-eastern Poland.

The village has a population of 140.

References

Stare Kapice